Tianwendian is the name of a border outpost and a military defence area of China in the northern Aksai Chin region under its administration (as part of Xinjiang). The region is roughly equivalent to the portion of Depsang Plains under Chinese control. Its headquarters, the Tianwendian outpost, is in the Chip Chap River valley close to China's Line of Actual Control with India.

Name
Tianwendian is taken to mean "astronomical point", but the literal meaning would be "sky art point", with "sky art" being interpreted to mean astronomy. The name is said to have been used to describe a military defence area in northern Aksai Chin in the run-up to the 1962 Sino-Indian War. The region was also referred to as the "sky defence area". The name is an obvious allusion to the high elevation of the area, reported as 6200 metres above sea level.

The region extends till the next defence area to the south, viz., Heweitan ("river beach").
The Depsang Bulge area has been referred to as the "South Tianwendian Valley",
its river Burtsa Nala as "Tiannan",
and its mountain pass to the Jeong Nala valley as the "Tianhexi Pass"—the "western pass between Tian(wendian) and He(weitan)". In this respect, Tianwendian is the Chinese equivalent of India's "Depsang Plains".

In the 1980s, a specific outpost named Tianwendian was established close to China's Line of Actual Control with India's Daulat Beg Oldi sector. Now it is more common to use the name to refer to the outpost than the defence area.

Military outpost

China originally established a military outpost in 1959 at Point 5243, which is at an elevation of 5243 meters above sea level.
It was composed of a border company.
In the run up to the 1962 war, China called the entire area Tianwendian Defence Area and used the Point 5243 post as its headquarters.

The newer Tianwendian post was established after the 1962 war. China said it was an astronomical observatory. A few years later India realised that it was an not an observatory but a military post. Over the years, China has continued to expand the post.

Around the time of the 2013 Daulat Beg Oldi incident, PLA constructed a radar station, an 11 m radome at an elevation of 5530m, at this outpost.

Forward Post 5390 
Between 2006 and 2008, China constructed forward post 5390 (named after the highest point in that area).

India-China Border Meeting point

The highest of the five Border Personnel Meeting points is located near Tianwendian. The Indian camp at Daulat Beg Oldi serves as the counter-party for this meeting point.

See also
 Shenxianwan

References

Bibliography
 

Aksai Chin
Barracks in China